Olpadronic acid (INN; salt form olpadronate) is a bisphosphonate.  It is used as part of a cancer symptom treatment support in cases of high blood calcium levels (hypercalcemia) and the reduction of fractures/pain that are the result of when cancer spreads to the bone (metastasis).

References

Bisphosphonates